Mussel Fork is a stream in Adair, Chariton, Linn, Macon and Sullivan counties in the U.S. state of Missouri. It is a tributary to the Chariton River.

The stream flows south to southeast entering the southwest corner of Adair County and into northwest Macon County. The stream flows south along the western border of Macon County passing east of the community of New Boston. The stream enters the southeast corner of Linn County as it crosses under U. S. Route 36 east of Bucklin. It passes into Chariton County four miles east of Marceline.

Mussel Fork was named for the river mussels along its course.

See also
List of rivers of Missouri

References

Rivers of Adair County, Missouri
Rivers of Chariton County, Missouri
Rivers of Linn County, Missouri
Rivers of Macon County, Missouri
Rivers of Sullivan County, Missouri
Rivers of Missouri